Athyma jina, the Bhutan sergeant, is a species of nymphalid butterfly found in tropical and subtropical Asia.

References

Cited references

J
Butterflies of Asia
Butterflies of Indochina
Lepidoptera of Nepal
Butterflies described in 1858